Vrbovec is a town in central Croatia.

Vrbovec may refer to:

 Vrbovec (Znojmo District), a municipality in the Czech Republic
 Vrbovec, Trebnje, a village in Slovenia
 Vrbovec, Kočevje, a village in Slovenia
 Vrbovec Samoborski, a village in Croatia

See also
 Vrbovac (disambiguation)
 Vrboec